The Malawi Congress Party (MCP) is a political party in Malawi. It was formed as a successor party to the banned Nyasaland African Congress when the country, then known as Nyasaland, was under British rule. The MCP, under Hastings Banda, presided over Malawian independence in 1964, and from 1966 to 1993 was the only legal party in the country. It has continued to be a major force in the country since losing power.

Following a court order to have a rerun of the 2019 Presidential election, a fresh Presidential election was held on 23 June 2020 which resulted in the MCP and its Tonse Alliance partners receiving approximately 60% of the national vote ushering the party back into government.

History
The Malawi Congress Party was the successor to the Nyasaland African Congress (NAC) party, which was banned in 1959. The MCP was founded in 1959 by Orton Chirwa, Nyasaland's first African barrister, soon after his release from Gwelo Prison, and other NAC leaders including Aleke Banda and S. Kamwendo, in agreement with Hastings Kamuzu Banda, who remained in prison. The purpose for dashing the original NAC to form the MCP was the need for free operation since NAC was a banned party by that time.

Orton Chirwa became the first MCP president and later was succeeded by Hastings Banda after he was released from Gwelo Prison. Banda continued to hold the Presidency until his death in 1997.

In the 1961 Nyasaland elections, the MCP won all the seats in the legislature and later led Nyasaland to independence as Malawi in 1964. When Malawi became a republic in 1966, the MCP was formally declared to be the only legal party. For the next 27 years, the government and the MCP were effectively one.  All adult citizens were required to be party members. They had to carry "party cards" in their wallets at all times.

The MCP lost its monopoly on power in a 1993 referendum and was roundly defeated in the country's first free elections the next year. It remains a major force in Malawian politics. It is strongest in the central region, populated by ethnic Chewa and Nyanja people.

Affiliates 
The current MCP set up has seen the sprung up  of affiliate groups  that are all working to strengthen the party. Among them are Kokoliko , Mighty Tambala Graduates, Born Free and Malawi Congress Party Diaspora Network (MCPDN) . The MCP Diaspora Network has seen all MCP members and supporters living outside Malawi  working together  in support of the mother party back home. It has Regional Wings in countries like UK, RSA, USA , Republic of Ireland , Canada and Gulf Region. The MCPDN current leader is UK based Chalo Mvula

Presidents
Orton Chirwa 1959-
Kamuzu Banda 1964–1994
Gwanda Chakuamba 1994–2003
John Tembo 2003–2013
Lazarus Chakwera 2013–present

MCP members
Kamuzu Banda
Gwanda Chakuamba
John Tembo
Lazarus Chakwera
Felix Mlusu
Sidik Mia
Catherine Gotani Hara
Eisenhower Mkaka
Maurice Munthali
Gerald Mzaza
Sam Kawale
Ezekiel Chingoma
Tricia Saidi
Rhoda Kamchacha
Harry Mkandawire
Khumbize Kandodo
Dennis Chikumbutso Amadi
 Akefe Kufa Mviza
 Chalo Mvula

Electoral history

Presidential elections

National Assembly elections

See also

Official web site

References

1960 establishments in Nyasaland
Political parties in Malawi
Parties of one-party systems
Political parties established in 1960
Anti-communist parties